Arthur Millward was a first-class cricketer and Test match umpire. Born in Kidderminster in 1858 he played one match for the North of England, scoring an unbeaten 19 in his only innings, and stood in 2 Test matches, the England v South Africa game at Lord's in 1907 and the Ashes match at Headingley in 1921. He died in Eastbourne in 1933.

References

1858 births
English cricketers
English Test cricket umpires
North v South cricketers
Sportspeople from Kidderminster
1933 deaths
Worcestershire cricketers